Máel Íosa Ua Dálaigh was an Irish poet. He died in 1185.

Biography
Máel Íosa (meaning "Follower of Jesus") was a member of the Ó Dálaigh family of bards, of whom some forty are attested in Ireland and Scotland between the 12th and 17th century.

Upon his death, he was described as "Chief poet of Ireland and Scotland." He was also lord of the minor midland kingdom of Corca Raidhe in what is now County Westmeath. The Irish annals give his obit sub anno 1185, stating:

"Maelisa O'Daly, ollave (chief poet) of Ireland and Scotland, Lord of Corcaree and Corca-Adain, a man illustrious for his poetry, hospitality, and nobility, died while on a pilgrimage at Clonard."

Máel Íosa would appear to have been the chief of the senior branch of the Ó Dálaigh, based in their ancestral home in Westmeath.

See also

 Cú Connacht Ó Dálaigh, died 1139
 Donnchadh Mór Ó Dálaigh, died 1244
 Muireadhach Albanach, alive 1228
 Gofraidh Fionn Ó Dálaigh, died 1387
 Aonghus Fionn Ó Dálaigh, died 1570
 Lochlann Óg Ó Dálaigh, fl. c. 1610
 Cearbhall Óg Ó Dálaigh, fl. 1630

External links
 http://www.ucc.ie/celt/itbardic.html#dmod

Medieval Irish poets
People from County Westmeath
12th-century Irish poets
12th-century Irish writers
1185 deaths
Year of birth unknown
Irish male poets
Irish-language writers